Bryan Lundbohm is an American former ice hockey coach center who was an All-American for North Dakota.

Career
Lundbohm began attending the University of North Dakota in 1998 after a successful junior career with included winning the Clark Cup in 1997. His first season with the Fighting Sioux was rather disappointing but Lundbohm recovered as a sophomore, scoring four times as many points. That season, Lundbohm helped UND win the national championship, assisting on the first goal in the final game and being named to the All-Tournament team. For his junior season, Lundbohm raised his scoring numbers even more and finished second in the nation, behind only teammate and Hobey Baker Award-finalist Jeff Panzer. He was named to the All-American team and again was part of a fantastic Fighting Sioux team. North Dakota reached the national final for the second year in a row but got down 0–2 after two periods. Lundbohm assisted on two goals in the final 4 minutes of regulation and sent the game into overtime. Unfortunately, Boston College netted the final goal, preventing a UND repeat.

Lundbohm left after his junior season and signed professionally with the Milwaukee Admirals. He played two seasons with the club but didn't seem to be getting any traction so he headed to Europe in 2003. His stay lasted just 10 games before he returned to Milwaukee and finished out the year with his best production to date. His season was ended prematurely by a pec injury in January, preventing him from playing for the club in its championship run. The next season saw a logjam in the minor leagues as a result of the NHL lockout. Coming off the injury, Lundbohm attended the Cleveland Barons' training camp but ended up starting the year with the Fort Worth Brahmas. He averaged over a point per game for the club before being called up to the AHL. He eventually found his way back to Milwaukee for his third stint with the team and produced moderate numbers.

In 2005 he signed with the Houston Aeros and settled into a checking role with the team. After his second one-year contract expired, Lundbohm made a second attempt in Europe. He appeared briefly for KalPa before finishing the year out in Denmark and then rejoined Houston. Now in his early 30s, Lundbohm's offensive production was declining but he was able to play in most of the team's games, helping them reach the conference finals. The next season, Lundbohm went scoreless in 11 games with the Syracuse Crunch and then finished the year in Norway before hanging up his skates.

After retiring, Lundbohm returned home to Roseau and began working as a tax accountant.

Personal life
Bryan's younger brother David also played college hockey at North Dakota. The two of them played together in 2000–01.

Statistics

Regular season and playoffs

Awards and honors

References

External links

1977 births
Living people
AHCA Division I men's ice hockey All-Americans
American men's ice hockey centers
Ice hockey people from Minnesota
People from Roseau, Minnesota
North Dakota Fighting Hawks men's ice hockey players
NCAA men's ice hockey national champions
Milwaukee Admirals players
HC Sierre players
Fort Worth Brahmas players
Grand Rapids Griffins players
Houston Aeros (1994–2013) players
KalPa players
SønderjyskE Ishockey players
Syracuse Crunch players
Sparta Warriors players